This is a list of aviation-related events from 2006.

Deadliest crash
The deadliest crash of this year was Pulkovo Aviation Enterprise Flight 612, a Tupolev Tu-154 which crashed near Sukha Balka, Ukraine on 22 August, killing all 170 people on board.

Events 
 The national airline of Ecuador, Ecuatoriana de Aviación, goes out of business. It had flown from 1957 to 1993 and again since 1996.

January
1 January – The Government of Latvia reforms the Latvia Civil Aviation Administration to form the Civil Aviation Agency, which becomes Latvia's national civil aviation authority. It also creates the Aircraft Accident and Incident Investigation Bureau of the Republic of Latvia, which later will become the country's Transport Accident and Incident Investigation Bureau.
5 January – Independence Air ceases operations after declaring bankruptcy.
6 January – Stunt pilot Eric Anthony Beard is killed when the Airpac Airlines Piper PA-34 Seneca crashes in a wooded area in approach to Burlington, Washington.
13 January – American Central Intelligence Agency RQ-1 Predator unmanned aerial vehicles fire several AGM-114 Hellfire missiles at a compound in Damadola, Pakistan, in an attempt to kill senior al-Qaeda leader Ayman al-Zawahiri. He is not present, and the airstrike instead kills at least 18 people, none of them al-Qaeda members.
19 January
A Slovak Air Force Antonov An-24V carrying Slovak peacekeepers home from Kosovo strays off course, begins its descent toward Košice International Airport in Košice, Slovakia, too early, and crashes in northern Hungary near Hejce and Telkibánya, killing 42 of the 43 people on board and injuring the lone survivor.
Jet Airways announces its purchase of Air Sahara, creating the largest domestic airline in India.

February
 1 February
The Transportation Safety Bureau replaces the Civil Aviation Safety Bureau of Hungary as the agency responsible for the investigation of aviation accidents in Hungary.
UAL Corporation, United Airlines parent company, emerges from bankruptcy for the first time since 9 December 2002, the longest such filing in history.
8–11 February – The American adventurer Steve Fossett breaks the record for the absolute longest-distance flight without landing by taking off from the Kennedy Space Center at Cape Canaveral, Florida, on 8 February, circumnavigating the world eastbound, and, after passing over Florida, continuing across the Atlantic Ocean for a second time to land in Bournemouth, England, after a flight of 76 hours 43 minutes, covering .
 16 February – Kobe Airport, a controversial offshore airport in Kobe, Japan, opens for airline service.

March
 10 March – Northwest Airlines purchases the United States Department of Transportation operating certificate of bankrupt Independence Air, which had ceased operations in January. Northwest plans to use the certificate for a new subcontractor regional airline, which will begin flight operations in May 2007 as Compass Airlines.
 14 March – The Cypriot airline Helios Airways is renamed Ajet.
 16 March – New Kitakyushu Airport, a controversial offshore airport in Kitakyūshū in northeastern Kyūshū, Japan, opens for airline service. The Japanese discount airline Star Flyer makes the first flight to the new airport, arriving from Haneda, Japan.
 25 March – The revolutionary scramjet engine Hyshot III, designed to fly at seven times the speed of sound is tested successfully at Woomera, Australia.
 29 March
The Royal Navys Fleet Air Arm withdraws the Sea Harrier from service.
Aeroméxico announces the inauguration of direct flights to Japan from Mexico City via Tijuana, Mexico. Aeroméxico becomes only the third Latin American airline in history to offer service to Asia.

April
 1 April – Swiss International Air Lines joins the Star Alliance.
 10 April – South African Airways joins the Star Alliance.
 19 April – Noted American test pilot and aircraft designer Scott Crossfield is killed when he flies his Cessna 210 into a severe thunderstorm and it breaks up in mid-air and crashes in mountainous terrain near Ellijay, Georgia. 
 24 April – Aeroflot joins the Skyteam airline alliance, making it the first Russian airline to join any airline alliance.

May
 EgyptAir Express is founded as a subsidiary of EgyptAir to offer domestic service in Egypt and on regional routes using Embraer E-170 jets. It will begin fight operations in June.
1 May – The airline Song ceases operations and turns its fleet over to its owner, Delta Air Lines.
3 May – Armavia Flight 967, an Airbus A320-211, is advised to halt its final descent into Sochi International Airport in Sochi, Russia, and begins a go-around, during which it crashes into the Black Sea, killing all 113 people on board.
6 May – The United States Air Force retires the last Lockheed Martin C-141 Starlifter in its inventory, an aircraft named Hanoi Taxi.  Hanoi Taxi lands for the last time and is received in a formal retirement ceremony at the National Museum of the United States Air Force at Wright-Patterson Air Force Base in Riverside, Ohio.
18 May – The worlds biggest passenger jet, the Airbus A380, lands at Heathrow Airport for the first time, making its debut in the United Kingdom.
23 May
During a mock dogfight between a Greek and a Turkish fighter over the southeastern Aegean Sea, the two aircraft collide, killing the Greek pilot.
Boeing delivers the last two Boeing 717 airliners produced; the customers receiving them are AirTran Airways and Midwest Airlines. Boeing had manufactured 156 Boeing 717s before ceasing production in April 2006 due to slow sales. The Boeing 717 is the last commercial airplane produced at Boeing's facility in Long Beach, California.

June
1 June – EgyptAir Express, a subsidiary of EgyptAir offering domestic service in Egypt and on regional routes using Embraer E-170 jets, begins flight operations.
3 June – A Chinese KJ-200 airborne warning and control system aircraft crashes in Anhui province in the People's Republic of China. All 40 people on board die.
23 June – The Royal Air Force retires its last English Electric Canberra from service. Canberras had been in service for 55 years.

July

 7 July – An Antonov An-12B operated by Mango Airlines of the Democratic Republic of the Congo suffers an engine failure after departure from Goma for a domestic flight to Kisangani.
 8 July – Scientists at the University of Toronto Institute for Aerospace Studies in Toronto, Ontario, Canada, conduct the first confirmed flight of a manned ornithopter operating under its own power.
 9 July – S7 Airlines Flight 778, an Airbus A310-300, crashes on landing at Irkutsk International Airport in Irkutsk, Russia, killing 124 of the 203 people on board and injuring all 79 survivors.
 10 July
 The Korea Aviation Accident Investigation Board merges with the Railway Accident Investigation Board to form the Aviation and Railway Accident Investigation Board, which becomes the government agency responsible for aviation accident investigations in South Korea.
All 45 people aboard Pakistan International Airlines Flight 688, a Fokker F27 Friendship, die in a crash on takeoff in Multan, Pakistan. Following the crash, Pakistan International withdraws all of its Fokker aircraft from service and replaces them with ATR aircraft.
 12 July – The 2006 Lebanon War begins when Hezbollah attacks against northern Israel prompt an Israeli response that includes air strikes against Hezbollah and transportation targets in Lebanon.
 13 July – The Israeli Air Force bombs Beirut Rafic Hariri International Airport in Lebanon, forcing it to close and international flights bound for Beirut to divert to Cyprus; Israel claims that Hezbollah has used the airport to smuggle arms and declares an air blockade of Lebanon. Israeli aircraft also bomb the main highway between Beirut and Damascus, Syria, as well as Hezbollah long-range missile launch sites and stockpiles, destroying 59 missile launchers in 34 minutes.
14 July – Israeli aircraft bomb the offices of the Secretary General of Hezbollah, Hassan Nasrallah.
15 July – The Israeli Air Force destroys Hezbollahs headquarters in Haret Hreik, Lebanon, and several offices and residences of senior Hezbollah officials, and Israeli attack helicopters pound targets in central Beirut. 
 19 July – Israeli warplanes carry out airstrikes against over 200 Hezbollah targets in Lebanon, including buildings and command posts, vehicles, and rocket launchers.
 20 July – Israel carries out 150 airstrikes on Lebanon, targeting Hezbollah structures, bases, headquarters, ammunition warehouses, vehicles, and rockets.
 21 July – Israel continues its airstrikes on Lebanon while massing troops on the border. Two Israeli helicopters collide in mid-air over northern Israel, leaving one Israeli soldier dead and three injured.
21–26 July – The 17th FAI World Precision Flying Championship is held in Troyes, France. Individual winners are 1. Krzysztof Wieczorek (Poland) in a 3Xtrim, 2. Janusz Darocha (Poland) in a Cessna 152, 3. Krzysztof Skrętowicz (Poland) in a 3Xtrim. Team winners are 1. Poland, 2. Czech Republic, 3. France.
22 July – Israeli aircraft conduct over 90 airstrikes against targets in Lebanon, hitting Hezbollah headquarters and buildings, media facilities, rocket launching sites, and major roads.
24 July – An Israeli Apache attack helicopter on its way to support ground forces in Lebanon crashes in northern Israel, killing its two-man crew. Hezbollah claims to have shot it down, while Israel says that the helicopter may have been hit by friendly fire.
 25 July – The Israeli Air Force conducts 100 airstrikes on southern Lebanon and Beirut.
 26 July
Israeli warplanes and artillery attack and destroy a United Nations observer post in Lebanon, killing all four United Nations observers inside. Israel claims that it had been trying to hit Hezbollah fighters in the vicinity, and did not target United Nations personnel deliberately.
An Israeli airstrike scores a direct hit on Hezbollahs missile command center in Tyre, Lebanon.
26–31 July – The 15th FAI World Rally Flying Championship takes place in Troyes, France. Individual winners are Wacław Wieczorek/Michał Wieczorek (Poland), Jiří Filip/Michal Filip (Czech Republic), and Petr Opat/Tomas Rajdl (Czech Republic). Team winners are 1. Czech Republic, 2. Poland, and 3. France.
 27 July – Israeli warplanes carry out 120 airstrikes in Lebanon, hitting suspected Hezbollah hideouts in hills and mountainous areas of the Bekaa Valley and targets in Beirut.
 29 July – Israeli Air Force airstrikes in Lebanon hit targets in Beirut, destroy Hezbollah long-range rocket launchers which had been used to attack Afula, destroy two bridges on the Orontes River and a road on the Lebanon-Syria border, and destroy a house in the Old City of Bint Jbeil, killing three Hezbollah fighters including commanders Khalid Bazzi and Sayiid Abu Tam. One Israeli airstrike wounds two Indian peacekeepers in Lebanon.
 30 July – An Israeli airstrike hits an apartment building in Qana, Lebanon, killing 28 civilians, more than half of them children. The airstrike is widely condemned.
 31 July – Israel announces a 48-hour halt to airstrikes depending on "operational developments" in Lebanon. However, Israeli airstrikes hit targets in southern Lebanon later in the day after Hezbollah attacks an Israeli tank, wounding three Israeli soldiers.

August
2 August – Ferried by helicopter, commandos of the Israeli Air Forces Shaldag Unit storm a Hezbollah stronghold in Baalbek, Lebanon,  from the border with Israel in Operation Sharp and Smooth. They kill 19 Hezbollah combatants and seize military equipment.
3 August – Hezbollah Secretary General Hassan Nasrallah warns Israel against further strikes against targets in Beirut and promises retaliation against Tel Aviv if such strikes continue. He also says that Hezbollah will stop its rocket campaign against Israel if Israel ceases aerial and artillery strikes against Lebanese towns and villages.
 4 August – Israel aircraft attack the southern outskirts of Beirut, and an Israeli airstike against a building in the area of al-Qaa in Lebanons Bekaa Valley kills 33 farm workers. IDF aircraft also strike a number of Hezbollah targets throughout Lebanon and hit the office of Hamas in Beirut. Thirty of the airstrikes are meant to disrupt the firing of Hezbollah rockets into Israel.
 5 August – The Israeli Air Force attacks over 80 Hezbollah targets in Lebanon.
6 August – The Israeli Air Force carries out airstrikes in Lebanon that kill at least 12 civilians, one Lebanese Army soldier, and a Popular Front for the Liberation of Palestine - General Command militant.
7 August
The Israeli Air Force attacks over 150 targets in Lebanon. During the strikes, Israeli aircraft bomb the Shiyyah suburb in Beirut, destroying three apartment buildings and killing at least 50 people.
The Israeli Air Force shoots down a Hezbollah unmanned aerial vehicle.
9 August – The Metropolitan Police Service arrests approximately 24 people in and around London for conspiring to detonate liquid explosives aboard at least 10 airliners travelling from the United Kingdom to the United States and Canada.
10 August – British authorities announce that a plot to simultaneously detonate bombs smuggled in hand luggage aboard ten airliners bound for the United States over the Atlantic Ocean has been foiled. Tightened security measures in the United Kingdom and United States and flight cancellations which happen afterwards cause severe chaos at several London airports.
11 August – Hezbollah shoots down an Israeli CH-53 Yas'ur helicopter with an anti-tank missile, killing five aircrew members. Hezbollah claims it attacked the helicopter with a Waad missile.
13 August
The Israeli Air Force shoots down two Hezbollah unmanned aerial vehicles, one of which was carrying at least  of explosives.
Air Algérie Flight 2208, a Lockheed L-100-30 Hercules cargo aircraft, suffers an autopilot malfunction that puts it into a very steep and rapid descent over northern Italy. It crashes, killing its entire crew of three.
14 August
The Israeli Air Force claims to have killed the head of Hezbollah's special forces, identified as Sajed Dewayer, in an airstrike. Hezbollah denies the claim. \
A ceasefire brings the 2006 Lebanon War to a close. During the 34-day war, the Israeli Air Force has flown more than 12,000 sorties, and 165 Israelis and more than 1,000 Lebanese have died.
18 August – Lebanese police sources report that Israeli Air Force planes had fired missiles at Baalbek, Lebanon. Lebanese officials later contradict the claim.
19 August – Airlifted by helicopters with two Humvees to a location near Baalbek, Lebanon, Israeli Sayeret Matkal commandos led by Lieutenant Colonel Emmanuel Moreno launch a raid in Lebanons Bekaa Valley to disrupt arms shipments to Hezbollah, attacking a Hezbollah base in the village of Bodei being used for weapons smuggling. Strikes by Israeli Air Force jets and attack helicopters prevent Hezbollah reinforcements from reaching the battle or encircling the commandos, who are eventually extracted after a gunfight with Hezbollah forces in which Moreno dies.
It would be the deadliest aviation disaster of 2006.
25 August – The first Block 20 RQ-4 Global Hawk is rolled out at Northrop Grummans Plant 42 manufacturing facility in Palmdale, California.
27 August
Comair Flight 5191, a Bombardier CRJ100 ER carrying 47 passengers and three crew members, attempts to take off from Blue Grass Airport in Lexington, Kentucky, using the wrong runway. The runway is too short, and the aircraft runs off the end of the runway and crashes without becoming airborne. The first officer survives in critical condition; the other 49 people on board die.
The Boeing 737-900ER/9GP is unveiled. Its first operator is Lion Air.
The record will stand until September 2017.

September
One of five existing Aerocar flying cars is put up for sale for US$3.5 million
1 September – Iran Air Tours Flight 945, a Tupolev Tu-154M, crashes while attempting to land in Mashad, Iran, killing 28 of the 148 people on board.
2 September – The Royal Air Force Hawker Siddeley Nimrod XV230 catches fire in the air during a reconnaissance flight due to a fuel leak that occurs during aerial refueling and crashes in the Panjwaye District of Afghanistan, killing all 14 people on board. It is the United Kingdoms single deadliest military loss since the Falklands War of 1982.
3 September – South Ossetian forces fire at a Georgian Mil Mi-8 (NATO reporting name "Hip") helicopter carrying Georgian Minister of Defense Irakli Okruashvili and the deputy chief of staff of the Georgian armed forces as it flies over the separatist-held territory of South Ossetia. The helicopter is slightly damaged but lands safely in Georgian government-controlled territory.
6 September – Lynx Aviation begins operation as a feeder airline for Frontier Airlines.
7 September – Israel lifts the air blockade of Lebanon it had imposed on 13 July.
8 September – BWIA West Indies Airways announces that it will shut down at the end of the year.
10 September – Swedish aerobatic champion Gabor Varga is killed instantly during the Aero GP race when his Yakovlev Yak-55 collides in mid-air over Marsamxett Harbour off Valletta, Malta, with an Extra EA-200 flown by Irish pilot Eddie Groggins. Groggins survives with minor injuries.
11 September – A Russian Ground Forces Mil Mi-8 helicopter crashes near Vladikavkaz, Russia, killing all 12 people on board, including Lieutenant-General Pavel Yaroslavtsev, deputy chief for army logistics, Lieutenant-General Viktor Guliaev, deputy chief of army medical units, and Major-General Vladimir Sorokin. The Ossetian rebel group Kataib al-Khoul claims to have shot the helicopter down. 
15 September – Mexican actor Pablo Santos is killed when he attempts an emergency landing at Toluca International Airport in Toluca, Mexico, after the Piper Malibu he is piloting runs low on fuel and crashes over a mile (1.6 km) short of the runway. One of his passengers is fatally injured and dies the following day, but his other five passengers survive.
19 September – A United States Air Force B-52H Stratofortress makes the first flight of a U.S. Air Force aircraft powered partially by a coal-based fuel, flying over Edwards Air Force Base, California, using a fuel made of a blend of conventional JP-8 jet fuel and Fischer–Tropsch fuel made from coal in two of its engines and JP-8 in its other six engines. The flight begins the final phase of U.S. Air Force test flights to achieve the certification of its B-52 fleet to operate on coal-based fuels.
22 September – Fighter Squadron 213 (VF-213) retires the last Grumman F-14 Tomcat fighter, an F-14D, from United States Navy service. During a U.S. Navy career of over 33 years, the F-14 has served as a long-range fleet air defense fighter, attack aircraft, and reconnaissance aircraft, and scored five air-to-air kills, shooting down four Libyan Air Force fighters and an Iraqi helicopter. The U.S. Navys retirement of the Tomcat means that the F-14 remains in service only with the Islamic Republic of Iran Air Force.
29 September – Gol Transportes Aéreos Flight 1907, a Boeing 737-8EH, collides in mid-air with an Embraer Legacy 600 business jet and crashes in Mato Grosso, Brazil. The Embraer Legacy, with seven on board, lands safely with no reported injuries. All 154 people on board the Boeing 737 perish.

October
1 October – The Spanish low-cost airline Clickair begins operations, with a fleet of three Airbus A320 airliners flying five routes from the airline's Barcelona hub.
3 October
Hakan Ekinci hijacks Turkish Airlines Flight 1476, a Boeing 737-400, over Greece, demanding to be flown to Rome, Italy, to speak to Pope Benedict XVI. Greek and Italian F-16 Fighting Falcons escort the plane to a landing in Brindisi, Italy, where Ekinci is arrested. No one is injured in the incident.
 An Israeli Air Force fighter penetrates the  defense perimeter of the French Navy frigate Courbet in the Mediterranean Sea off Lebanon without answering radio calls, triggering a diplomatic incident.
10 October – Atlantic Airways Flight 670, a BAe 146, slides off the runway at Stord, Norway, killing four of the 16 people on board.
 11 October – New York Yankees baseball pitcher Cory Lidle's Cirrus SR20 aircraft stalls during a tight turn and crashes into the 20th story of a 50-story Manhattan residential building in New York City, killing Lidle and his flight instructor.
 24 October – Six Israeli Air Force F-16 Fighting Falcons fly over a German Navy vessel patrolling in the Mediterranean Sea off Israels coast just south of the Lebanese border as part of a United Nations Interim Force in Lebanon (UNIFIL) effort to enforce an arms embargo against Hezbollah. The German Defense Ministry says that the planes launched infrared decoy flares and that one of them had fired two shots into the air. The Israeli military says that a German helicopter took off from the vessel without having coordinated its flight with Israel, and denies that its planes fired any shots at the vessel or launched flares over it.
25 October – Oasis Hong Kong Airlines begins service with a departure for London Gatwick Airport scheduled. Due to problems with rights to fly over Russia, the initial flight is delayed to 26 October.
26 October – The left wing of a Swedish Coast Guard CASA C-212 Aviocar detaches in flight due to metal fatigue while the plane is making a low-level pass over the Skanör-Falsterbo Coast Guard Station in Sweden. The C-212 crashes in the Falsterbo Canal, killing all four people on board. The crash prompts the Swedish Coast Guard to ground its two surviving C-212s, which it sells to Uruguay.
28 October – Continental Airlines Flight 1883, a Boeing 757-224 with 154 people on board, mistakenly lands on a taxiway instead of a runway at Newark Liberty International Airport in Newark, New Jersey, United States. It rolls to a stop without incident.
29 October – ADC Airlines Flight 53, a Boeing 737-2B7, crashes just after takeoff from Nnamdi Azikiwe International Airport in Abuja, Nigeria, killing 96 of the 105 people on board and injuring all nine survivors. One person on the ground also dies. 
30 October – An airstrike kills 70 to 80 people in Chenagai, Pakistan. Eyewitnesses claim that American unmanned aerial vehicles conducted the strikes, with three Pakistani Army helicopter gunships arriving later to fire rockets into neighboring hillsides. The United States denies involvement and Pakistan claims that it conducted the airstrike, but Pakistan later denies involvement, saying it was an American strike and that Pakistan had only claimed involvement to cover for the United States.
31 October – The Cypriot airline Ajet, formerly known as Helios Airways, ceases operations.

November
1 November – The airline Emirates cancels its order for 10 Airbus A340-600HGW aircraft.
3 November – Qantas announces an order for eight more Airbus A380s and an order for four Airbus A330-200s.
7 November
The Royal Australian Air Forces first C-17 Globemaster III makes its maiden flight.
FedEx announces the first cancellation of an order for the Airbus A380. Instead, it orders 15 Boeing 777 Freighters.
14 November – EasyJet announces an order for 52 Airbus A319s.
20 November – Six Muslim imams are removed from USAirways Flight 300 at Minneapolis-St. Paul International Airport in Hennepin County, Minnesota, after crew members and other passengers aboard the plane become alarmed by what they claim is suspicious behavior by the imams. After the imams seek damages, USAirways will settle with them out of court in 2009.
26 November – United Airlines Flight 814, a Boeing 737, returns safely to Denver International Airport in Denver, Colorado, after striking a coyote on takeoff.

December
1 December
 Hong Kong-based CR Airways changes its name to Hong Kong Airlines.
 Air Berlin orders 60 Boeing 737s, with their delivery scheduled for November 2007.
 The United States Air Force inactivates the Sixteenth Air Force, simultaneously reconstituting it as the 16th Air Expeditionary Task Force.
5 December – Lufthansa becomes the first airline to order the Boeing 747-8. It orders 20 of the planes, with options for an additional 20.
8 December – A National Aeronautics and Space Administration (NASA) F/A-18 Hornet modified with Active Aeroelastic Wing (AAW) Technology is designated the X-53.
10 December – A Bell 412SP medevac helicopter crashes in mountainous terrain near Hesperia, California, killing all three people – the pilot and two medical crew members – on board. A fire resulting from the crash burns two acres (8,100 square meters) of the mountainside.
19 December – A United States Air Force B-52H Stratofortress makes the first flight of a U.S. Air Force aircraft powered entirely by a coal-based fuel, flying over Edwards Air Force Base, California, using a fuel made by Syntroleum of a blend of conventional JP-8 jet fuel and Fischer–Tropsch fuel made from coal in all eight of its engines.
27 December – A Eurocopter AS365 Dauphin crashes approximately 24 miles from the shoreline of Morecambe Bay, Lancashire, England, while transporting gas platform crews. Six of the seven people aboard die, with the seventh missing and never recovered.
29 December – FlyersRights.org is founded as an American not-for-profit organization that supports legislation protecting the rights of airline passengers, improving visibility in the reporting of flight delays by commercial airlines, and increasing the distance between rows of airline seats.
30 December – A U.S. Air Force Boeing VC-25A transports the body of former U.S. President Gerald R. Ford from Palm Springs International Airport in Palm Springs, California, to Washington, D.C., for memorial services.
31 December – BWIA West Indies Airways shuts down after 66 years of operations. It is replaced by a new entity, Caribbean Airlines, the next day.

First flights

January
 7 January - Spectrum S-33 Independence
 31 January – Lockheed Martin P-791

March
 3 March - Arion Lightning
 13 March - Hongdu JL-10

April
7 April – First free-flight of Boeing X-37
 18 April - Diamond D-Jet

May
 13 May - Excel-Jet Sport Jet

June
8 June – Bell 417
19 June – Lockheed C-5M Super Galaxy
23 June – Cessna NGP

July
 6 July - Dean-Wilson Whitney Boomerang
 8 July - UTIAS Ornithopter No.1
 29 July - Kestrel K-350

August
9 August – BAE Skylynx II UAV
15 August – EA-18 Growler First production aircraft

September
5 September – Boeing 737-900ER.
12 September – Boeing 747 Large Cargo Freighter.
 15 September - DAC RangeR

October
 6 October - US Aircraft A-67 Dragon
13 October – Cessna 162 Skycatcher concept aircraft N158CS
 16 October - Nexaer LS1
23 October – Production CH-47F Chinook

November
 9 November - Van's Aircraft RV-12

December
15 December – Lockheed Martin F-35 Lightning II

Entered service 
 February – Boeing 777-200LR Worldliner with PIA

Retirements 
 22 September – Grumman F-14 Tomcat from United States Navy service by Fighter Squadron (VF-213)

References

 
Aviation by year